Mayoschizocera is a genus of tachinid flies in the family Tachinidae.

Distribution
Peru.

Species
M. hamata Townsend, 1927

References

Tachininae
Diptera of South America